The Nikkō Kirifuri Ice Arena (日光霧降アイスアリーナ) is an indoor sporting arena in the city of Nikkō, Tochigi, Japan. It is primarily used for ice hockey, and is the home arena of Nikkō Ice Bucks of the Asia League Ice Hockey.

It was opened in 1992 and holds 2,000 seats (1,608 seated and 392 standing only).

References
 Japanese Hockey Arenas 

Indoor ice hockey venues in Japan
Indoor arenas in Japan
Sports venues completed in 1992
Sports venues in Tochigi Prefecture
Nikkō, Tochigi
1992 establishments in Japan